Herbert Brownlow Kennedy  (26 May 1863 – 28 May 1939) was Dean of Christ Church Cathedral, Dublin from 1921 to 1938.

Kennedy was the son of the Very Reverend T. Le Ban Kennedy, Dean of Clogher from 1874 to 1887. He was educated at The Royal School, Armagh and Trinity College, Dublin. After being a curate at St Ann’s Dublin he was an   incumbent at Holywood, Naas, St Andrew’s Dublin and Kingstown
before his appointment as dean.

Notes

External links
 

1863 births
1939 deaths
People educated at The Royal School, Armagh
Alumni of Trinity College Dublin
Deans of Christ Church Cathedral, Dublin